This page lists the rosters for the 2009 IIHF World Championship Division I.

Division IA

Head coach:  Steve McKenna

Head coach:  Pavle Kavčič

Head coach:  Mark Mahon

Head coach:  Andrei Shayanov

Head coach:  Dmitrij Medvedev

Head coach:  John Harrington

Division IB

Head coach:  Paul Thompson

Head coach:  Rick Cornacchia

Head coach:  Tommie Hueartogs

Head coach:  Peter Ekroth

Head coach:  Thomas Skinner

Head coach:  Oleksandr Seukand

References

See also
2009 IIHF World Championship

Iihf World Championship Division I Rosters, 2009